The National Drug Authority (NDA) is a government-owned organisation in Uganda, mandated to regulate drugs in the country, including their manufacture, importation, distribution, and licensing.

Overview
NDA was created by the Ugandan legislature in 1993. It began operations in 1994 as the National Drug Authority (NDA). At that time, the mission of the NDA was to regulate the manufacture, importation, and use of human and veterinary drugs in the country. In 2014, the Ugandan Cabinet approved plans to expand the NDA into the NFDA by adding food, food additives, food supplements, cosmetics, and commercial animal feeds to the items under the organization's supervision. The relevant laws transforming NDA into NFDA are before the Ugandan Parliament for promulgation.

Location
The headquarters of the NDA was located at 46-48 Lumumba Avenue but has moved to Rummee Towers, in Kampala Central Division, on Nakasero Hill, in the central business district of Kampala, the capital and largest city of Uganda. The coordinates of the head office are 0°19'36.0"N, 32°34'32.0"E (Latitude:0.326667; Longitude:32.575556).

NDA maintains regional offices at the following locations:

The agency works in collaboration with the Uganda Ministry of Health and the Uganda Ministry of Agriculture, Animal Industry and Fisheries.

History
As far back as 2010, elements of the Uganda government recognized the need to regulate food manufacture, importation, labeling, distribution, and marketing to reduce food and water-borne diseases in the country as well as to ensure food safety. Efforts to assign the regulatory function to the then existing NDA began then.

Governance
The agency is governed by a 17-person member board, which serves for a four-year renewable term. Its members include the following individuals, effective January 2017:
 
 Medard Bitekyerezo: Chairman
 Brigadier Ambrose Musinguzi
 Raymond Agaba
 Muhammad Mbabali
 Yahaya Hills Sekagya
 Fadhiru Kamba Pakoyo
 Hanifa Sengendo Namaala
 Sembatya Kimbowa
 Bildard Baguma
 Grace Nambatya Kyeyune
 Sylvia Angubua Baluka
 Rose Okurut Ademun
 Baterana Byarugaba
 Moses Kamabare
 Daniel Obua
 Morris Seru
 Grace Akullo.

See also
 Economy of Uganda
 Quality Chemicals Limited
 Quality Chemical Industries Limited
 Uganda Revenue Authority

References

External links

 Uganda: Cabinet Broadens NDA's Mandate
Experts Disagree On New Medicine, Food Authority
NDA withdraws dangerous drugs, vaccines

Regulatory agencies of Uganda
Organizations established in 1994
Organisations based in Kampala
1994 establishments in Uganda
Food safety organizations
National agencies for drug regulation
Medical and health organisations based in Uganda